Almaty, formerly known as Alma-Ata, is the largest city in Kazakhstan, with a population of over 2 million. It was the capital of Kazakhstan from 1929 to 1936 as an autonomous republic as part of the Soviet Union, then from 1936 to 1991 as a union republic and finally from 1991 as an independent state to 1997 when the government relocated the capital to Akmola (renamed Astana in 1998, Nur-Sultan in 2019, and back to Astana in 2022).

Almaty is still the major commercial, financial, and cultural centre of Kazakhstan, as well as its most populous and most cosmopolitan city. The city is located in the mountainous area of southern Kazakhstan near the border with Kyrgyzstan in the foothills of the Trans-Ili Alatau at an elevation of 700–900 m (2,300–3,000 feet), where the Large and Small Almatinka rivers run into the plain. The city, just like Astana and Shymkent, does not belong to any region and is officially a "city of state importance".

The city has been part of the UNESCO Creative Cities Network in the area of music since November 2017. The city was the host for a 1978 international conference on Primary Health Care where the Alma Ata Declaration was adopted, marking a paradigm shift in global public health.

Status

From 1929 to 1936, the city, then known as Alma-Ata, was the capital of the Kazakh ASSR. From 1936 to 1991, Alma-Ata was the capital of the Kazakh SSR. After Kazakhstan became independent in 1991, the city was renamed Almaty in 1993 and continued as the capital until 1997, when the capital was moved to Akmola (renamed Astana in 1998, Nur-Sultan in 2019, and again Astana in 2022). Since then Almaty has been referred to as the 'southern capital' of Kazakhstan.

Almaty remains the largest, most developed, and most ethnically and culturally diverse city in Kazakhstan. Due to development by the Soviet Union and relocation of workers and industries from European areas of the Soviet Union during World War II, the city has a high proportion of ethnic Russians and Uyghurs. The city lies in the foothills of Trans-Ili Alatau (or Zailiysky Alatau) in the extreme south-east.

It has a relatively mild climate with warm and dry summers and quite cold winters. Since the city is in a tectonically active area, it has an endemic risk of earthquakes. Although most tremors do not cause any significant damage, Almaty has suffered some large destructive earthquakes.

Etymology
The name Almaty has its roots in the medieval settlement Almatau, that existed near the present-day city. A disputed theory holds that the name is derived from the Kazakh word for 'apple' (алма), and is often translated as "full of apples". 
Originally it was Almatau which means Apple Mountain.

There is great genetic diversity among the wild apples in the region surrounding Almaty; the region west of the Tian Shan mountains is thought to be the apple's ancestral home. The wild Malus sieversii is considered a likely candidate for the ancestor of the modern domestic apple.

History

Prehistoric Almaty
During 1000–900 BC in the Bronze Age, the first farmers and cattle-breeders established settlements in the territory of Almaty. During the Saka period (from 700 BC to the beginning of the Christian era), these lands were occupied by the Saka and later Wusun tribes, who inhabited the territory north of the Tian Shan mountain range. Evidence of these times can be found in the numerous burial mounds (tumuli) and ancient settlements, especially the giant burial mounds of the Saka tsars. The most famous archaeological finds have been "The Golden Man", also known as "The Golden Warrior", from the Issyk Kurgan; the Zhalauly treasure, the Kargaly diadem, and the Zhetysu arts bronzes (boilers, lamps and altars). During the period of Saka and Wusun governance, Almaty became an early education centre.

15th–18th centuries
In the 15th–18th centuries, the city was in decline as trade activities were decreasing on this part of the Silk Road. European nations were conducting more overseas trade by shipping. This period was one of crucial ethnic and political transformations.

The Dzungar invaded, dominating the Kazakh people for a period. The Kazakh fought to protect their land and preserve independence. During the eighteenth century, the city and region was roughly on the border between the Khanate of Kokand and Qing Empire. It was then absorbed as part of the Russian Empire in the 1850s.

Foundation of Verny

To defend its empire, Russia built Fort Verny near the Trans-Ili Alatau mountain range between the Bolshaya and Malenkaya Almatinka rivers. Construction began on 4 February 1854 and was nearly completed by the autumn of that year. The fort was a wooden palisade, shaped like a pentagon, with one side built along the Malaya Almatinka. Later, the wood fence was replaced with a brick wall with embrasures. The main facilities were erected around the large square for training and parading.

In 1867 Verniy Fort was developed as a town called Almatinsk; the town soon returned to the name Verny.

On 28 May 1887, at 4 a.m., an earthquake almost totally destroyed Verny in 11–12 minutes. 

By 1906 the population of the city had grown to 27,000, two-thirds of whom being Russians and Ukrainians.

Soviet era

In 1918 following the Russian Revolution and the establishment of the Bolshevik government, Soviet power was established in Verny. The city and the region became part of the Turkestan Autonomous Soviet Socialist Republic (RSFSR). On 5 February 1921, Verny was renamed Alma-Ata, one of the city's ancient names, by a joint consultation of regional government representatives, professional trade associations, and local faith-based groups.

In 1926, the Council of Labor and Defence approved the construction of the Turkestan–Siberia Railway that was a crucial element of the future growth of Kazakhstan, especially in the east and southeast of the region. The Turkestan–Siberia Railway construction also had a decisive economic impact that strongly influenced the destiny of Alma-Ata as the capital of the Kazakh ASSR. In 1930 the construction of the highway and railway to Alma-Ata was completed.

On 29 April 1927, the government decided to transfer the capital of the Kazakh Autonomous Soviet Socialist Republic from Kyzyl-Orda to Alma-Ata, within the RFSFR. This attracted more trade and people working with the government, stimulating intensive development in the city.

On 31 January 1928, Leon Trotsky, leader of the 1917 October Revolution, accompanied by his wife Natalia Sedova and his son Lev Sedov, was exiled to Alma-Ata by Joseph Stalin, then head of the All-Union Communist Party (Bolsheviks) in Moscow. Trotsky was expelled from Alma-Ata to Turkey in February 1929, and went into exile in Mexico City.

The Alma-Ata airport was opened in 1930, opening up a direct connection from Alma-Ata to Moscow, the center of the Soviet government. Alma-Ata became the main entry by air to Kazakhstan, a status which it retains today. Transformation of this small town into the capital of the Kazakh SSR was accelerated by the large-scale construction of new administrative and government facilities and housing. The Great Purge of 1936–38 extended to Kazakhstan, where numerous intellectuals, activists, leaders, teachers and others were killed. The Soviet government dominated the population. During the 1930s Kazakh nomads suffered starvation after disruption of their traditional living patterns. (see: Asharshylyq)

In 1936 the Architecture and Planning Bureau developed a plan to enhance Alma-Ata as the new cultural capital of the Kazakh SSR. The plan was based on the existing rectangular system of districts. They were to be strengthened and reconstructed.

World War II
During World War II the government dramatically affected the city's population and structures. To better organize the home front and concentrate industrial and material resources, the government evacuated 26,000 people and numerous industries from the European theatre of war. Alma-Ata hosted over 30 industrial facilities removed from the European section of the USSR, eight evacuated hospitals, 15 institutes, universities and technical schools; and around 20 cultural institutions. Motion picture production companies from Leningrad, Kyiv, and Moscow were also moved to Alma-Ata at this time. This brought in so many ethnic Russians that the Kazakhs became a minority in the region.

Industrialization 

During the years 1941–1945 the industrial potential of the city increased significantly. Development increased during the postwar years. The population of the city grew from 104,000 in 1919 to 365,000 in 1968. By 1967 the city had 145 enterprises, with the bulk of these being light and food industries.

The main industries in Alma-Ata were: food processing (36% of gross industrial output), based largely on locally abundant fruit and vegetable raw materials, light industry (31%), and heavy industry (33%). The main products of the region were:
Food: Meat, flour and cereals (pasta factory), milk, wines, canned fruit, tobacco, confectionery, alcoholic spirits, beer, yeast, and tea (packaging)
Light industry: textiles, fur, knitting, carpets, footwear, apparel, printing, and the Almaty Cotton combine.
Heavy industry: electrical engineering, foundry engineering, car repair, bearing repair, building materials, woodworking, concrete structures and structural elements, and housebuilding.

Urban development

From 1966 to 1971, 1,400,000 square metres of public and cooperative housing were built. Annually, around 300,000 square metres of dwellings were under construction. Most of the buildings constructed during this time were earthquake-proof multi-story buildings. The Soviet government tried to diversify architectural forms to create a more varied cityscape. During this period, many schools, hospitals, cultural, and entertainment facilities were constructed, including Lenin's Palace, the Kazakhstan Hotel, and the Medeo Sports Complex.

The supersonic transport Tupolev Tu-144 went into service on 26 December 1975, carrying mail and freight between Moscow and Alma-Ata in preparation for passenger services; these began in November 1977. The Aeroflot flight on 1 June 1978 was the 55th and last scheduled passenger flight of the Tu-144.

Alma-Ata was the host city for a 1978 international conference on Primary Health Care. The Alma Ata Declaration was adopted, marking a paradigm shift in global public health.

On 16 December 1986, the Jeltoqsan riot took place in the Brezhnev Square (now Republic Square) in response to General Secretary Mikhail Gorbachev's dismissal of Dinmukhamed Kunayev.

On 7 September 1988, the subway Almaty Metro project started construction; the subway was opened on 1 December 2011 after 23 years.

Post–independence
Kazakhstan declared its independence from the Soviet Union on 16 December 1991 (Kazakhstan Independence Day), and one year later, on 28 January 1993, the government renamed the city from the Russian Alma-Ata to the Kazakh name Almaty.

In 1997 the President of the Republic of Kazakhstan Nursultan Nazarbayev approved the decree to transfer the capital from Almaty to Astana in the north of the country. On 1 July 1998 a law was passed to establish the special status of Almaty as a scientific, cultural, historical, financial, and industrial centre.

The new general plan of Almaty for 2030 was released in 1998. It is intended to create ecologically safe, secure, and socially comfortable living conditions in the city. The main objective is to promote Almaty's image as a garden-city.

It proposes continued multi-storied and single-housing development, reorganization of industrial districts or territories, improving transport infrastructure, and expanding the Almaty Metro. The first line of the Almaty metro was launched on 1 December 2011, two weeks ahead of schedule. The extension of the line to Qalqaman was opened in 2015.

Nevertheless, Almaty has developed a major problem with air pollution. Already in 1995, particulate emissions, then mostly from the city's thermal power station, exceeded Kazakh and EU standards by over 20 times. In 2008, Almaty was ranked the 9th most polluted city in the world. A 2013 study identified cars as a major source of pollution, and it was noted since 2003 and 2013 morbidity had increased by a factor of 1.5, and that the city takes the first place in the republic on respiratory, endocrine and blood diseases, cancer and bronchial asthma, even though there are no major industrial installations. An independent local air quality monitoring system with a mobile app was launched in 2017.

The area of the city has been expanded during recent years with the annexation of the suburban settlements of Kalkaman, Kok Tube, Gorniy Gigant District (Mountain Giant). Numerous apartment blocks and office skyscrapers have transformed the face of the town, which has been built into the mountains. Squatter settlements such as Shanyrak have resisted eviction in the face of these development plans.

Almaty was the site of a notorious terrorist attack in July 2016, when Jihadist Ruslan Kulikbayev killed eight police officers and two civilians in a shootout and car chase. Kulikbayev was wounded during the shootout and later sentenced to death for the attack.

In March of 2020, the first cases of COVID-19 were reported in the city. Soon, Almaty was transformed, as the pandemic led the city into a changed behavior.  The government imposed lockdowns of most institutions. 

In January 2022, Almaty was plunged into unrest as part of a national political crisis.

Administrative divisions 

There are 8 official Almaty city districts :

    Alatau district
    Almaly district
    Auezov district
    Bostandyk district
    Jetysu district
    Medeu district
    Nauryzbay district
    Turksib district

Geography 
Almaty is located in south-eastern Kazakhstan, almost 1000 km from the capital Astana. Kyrgyzstan's capital Bishkek is 190 km to the west, while Ürümqi in China is almost 1000 km east.

The region is also home to the Mynjylky mountain plateau, an elevated plain located at the source of the Malaya Almaatinka river at an altitude of 3000 meters above sea level.

Climate 
Almaty has a humid continental climate (Köppen climate classification: Dfa) with hot summers and cold winters. It is characterized by the influence of mountain–valley circulation. This is especially evident in the northern part of the city, located directly in the transition zone of the mountain slopes to the plains.

In average years frost starts on about 14 October and ends on about 18 April, with sustained extreme cold from about 19 December to about 23 February, a period of about 67 days. Weather with temperature above  is average for about 36 days a year. In the center of Almaty, like any large city, there is a "heat island" – the average daily temperature contrast between the northern and southern suburbs of the city is 3.8% in the coldest days and 2.2% in the hottest five days. Therefore, frost in the city center starts about 7 days later and finishes 3 days earlier than in the northern suburbs. April and May are the wettest months, during which about a third of the city's annual precipitation is received.

It is not uncommon to see snow or a cold snap hitting Almaty as late as the end of May. For example, in the last quarter century, such snowfalls were recorded on 13 May 1985, 1 May 1989, 5 May 1993 and 18 May 1998. The record latest snowfall in Almaty was on 17 June 1987.

Almaty sometimes experiences winter rain, despite heavy preceding snowfall and low temperatures. The most memorable winter rain took place on 16 December 1996 during a military parade to celebrate the 5th anniversary of the Independence of the Republic.

Almaty Weather Station's GM mostly records south-easterly wind (30%), its resistance increases during the summer (37%) and falls in winter (19%). Wind speeds exceed 15 m/s on about 15 days a year, on average.

Seismic activity in the territory of Kazakhstan

Industrially developed and densely populated areas in the south and southeast of Kazakhstan are situated in the zones where the maximum magnitudes of expected earthquakes are from 6.0 to 8.3 (the intensity of I0=8–10).

The south seismic active zone of Kazakhstan is a part of the North Tian-Shan ridge system. The main city of Almaty is located near the Zailiski Alatau mountain base. In recorded history prior to the late 19th century, three catastrophic earthquakes are known to have taken place there. The following are the dates of occurrence and extracts from the historical chronicles of the times:

1770, "...Belovodka village was buried";
1807, "a horrible catastrophe took place in Almaty";
1865, Strong earthquake

Their magnitudes were 9 and 11 on the MSK scale – 64, and their centres were located within . Centres were located in a south and south–east directions:
(1887 y., K=17.14) Vernenskoe
(1889 y., K=19.12) Chilik
(1911 y., K=18.76) Keminskoe

K – indicates the energy of the earthquake.

In each of these earthquakes, the city suffered wide destruction.

The Territory of the Kyrgyz State adjoins North Tian-Shan.

Demographics

Ethnic groups

Religion

Culture
Almaty is largely considered to be the heart and soul of Kazakhstan's classical and popular cultures. The Almaty Region and the city itself have a distinct vibe and pace compared to other regions and cities in Kazakhstan. Contemporary Almaty has a more European vibe due to more cafes and restaurants with outdoor seating and public green space. Kazakh culture and zeitgeist identify as the genetic origin, or fatherland, of the wild apple Malus siversii. Almaty is the historical and contemporary capital of intellectualism in Kazakhstan as a result of Almaty's location along the Ancient Silk Road and that many Russian intellectuals were exiled to the region and to Karlag. The Abai Kazakh State Opera and Ballet Theatre has anchored the city's theater scene since 1934 and was founded around a community of local performance artists. The Kasteyev State Museum of Arts was founded in 1935, is the largest museum in Kazakhstan, and has the largest collection of artworks by Kazakh classic and contemporary artists.

Theaters 

Theatrical art began to develop in the city of Verny a few years after the construction of the Russian fort.  On 21 November 1872, the Society of Dramatic Art Lovers staged the first production in the city:  A. N. Ostrovsky's play, "Stay in Your Own Sled".  Later, plays were performed at public, military, and commercial gatherings.  An abridgement of Glinka's opera "A Life for the Tsar" was the first opera staged in the city, by the Kolpakovsky three-year city school on 23 February 1913 at the Commercial Assembly, to commemorate the tercentenary of the Romanov dynasty.

The flowering of theatrical art in the city began during the Soviet period of Alma-Ata, resulting from the transfer of the capital of the Kazakh Soviet Socialist Republic from Kyzylorda to Alma-Ata.  Thus, the Kazakh Drama Theater, the first Kazakh professional theater, moved to the city.  In the 1930s, the Opera and Ballet Theater (1934) and the Puppet Theater (1935) were established in the city.  Also, theater companies founded in different cities of the republic began to move to the capital:  the Russian Drama Theater (moved from Semipalatinsk in 1934), the Uyghur Musical Comedy Theater (from Chilik, 1962), the Korean Musical Comedy Theater (from Kyzylorda, 1968), and the German Drama Theater (from Temirtau, 1989).

After Kazakhstan regained independence in 1991, a large number of new independent theaters appeared in the city.  Often these are modern youth concert venues created by enthusiasts.  They face funding problems, as maintaining a permanent theater company is costly.

Museums 

A significant contribution to the study of the history of culture, ethnography of southern Kazakhs in the late 19th–20th centuries was made by Turkestan scientists and local historians, united around the scientific societies and cultural and educational institutions of Tashkent. In 1874, from the private collections of travelers who visited Semirechye with a scientific and regional purpose and with the help of the local intelligentsia, a museum was first created in the city of Verny, which was later transformed into a village museum of the Semirechye Cossack Host. This date is the day of the foundation of the first museum in Semirechye. The foundation of the A. Kasteev Museum of Arts was laid by the Kazakh State Art Gallery named after T.G. Shevchenko, founded in 1935. Its main tasks were to collect the best works of Kazakh artists and organize their creative business trips. In 1936, museums in Moscow and Leningrad (now St. Petersburg) donated a significant number of paintings, graphics, sculpture and applied art to the gallery. By the end of the 1950s, the gallery's funds numbered over 5,000 exhibits, including paintings, reproductions of works by pre-revolutionary and Soviet artists, Western European and Eastern masters of art. In the 1970s and 1980s, new buildings were built for existing museums, and new thematic museums were opened: books, musical instruments, archeology, and others. A significant contribution to the development of the museum business was the opening of the Museum of the History of Almaty, which created an association of museums in the city of Almaty and the state institution "Gylym Ordasy", which united 4 museums, which allows to systematize scientific work.

Cinemas 
The first film screening in the city of Verny took place in 1900, when the physicist K.O. Krause arrived in the city. On it, hand-painted glass transparencies were demonstrated with the help of an overhead projector. The film show took place on 25 January in the Pushkin Garden. In January 1911, the building of the first private cinema "Twentieth Century" was opened at the intersection of Pushkin and Gogol streets, which belonged to the entrepreneur A. R. Seifullin. For the demonstration of films, the cinema was equipped with the first power plant in the history of the city, produced by the British company "Petter", with 14 horsepower. The cinema building burned down in February 1918. Starting in the 1930s, summer cinemas began to appear in the parks of the city, which were later transformed into full-fledged cinemas. Thus, the Rodina Cinema was first opened in the Central Park in 1937. In 1957, it was rebuilt from a seasonal venue into a wide-screen cinema with an auditorium for 712 seats. In another park of the city, the Park of the Federation of Soviet Republics, the Progress Cinema was opened, later renamed Alma-Ata. By the early 1990s, there were 21 cinemas in the city. All cinemas were divided into first, second and third screens. The cinemas of the first screen, in which the premieres of new films took place, were "Alatau", "Tselinny" and "Arman". Film films arrived at the cinemas of the third screen in a deplorable state, with glues and cuts. That is, the quality of showing the film depended on the screening of the cinema. Cinemas in the city were single-screen, two halls were owned by the cinema centers "Kazakhstan", "Arman" and "Tselinny". In the 2000s, cinemas began to open in shopping and entertainment centers, and as a result, existing stationary cinemas began to lose popularity and close.

Economy

Almaty generates approximately 20% of Kazakhstan's GDP (or $36 billion in 2010). The city accounts for above 20% of government revenues and 60% of bank credits. The nation is the most powerful economically in Central Asia and Almaty is a key financial center. It is considered to be a Beta- Global City as of the 2012 GaWC study.

One of the largest industries in Almaty is finance, and its financial exports make it a large contributor to Kazakhstan's balance of payments. Almaty is home to Halyk Bank, which is the largest bank in Central Asia, Kaspi Bank, and other major banks. The Kazakhstan Stock Exchange is based in Almaty.

Almaty is also developing as a regional financial and business centre (RFCA).

Under construction is the 'Almaty Financial District and Esentai Park'. This was designed by T.J. Gottesdiener, who designed both 7 World Trade Center in New York City and Tokyo Midtown. Its goal is to become the largest business centre in Central Asia.  Esentai Tower, a 37-floor building in the park, is the tallest mixed-use building in Kazakhstan, housing offices of companies such as Ernst & Young, HSBC and Credit Suisse. The first Ritz-Carlton Hotel in Kazakhstan opened in 2013 in Esentai Tower.

Along with professional services, media companies are concentrated in Almaty. The media distribution industry has been growing rapidly since 2006. Major broadcasting channels KTK and NTK are based in Almaty, as are several national newspapers.

There are plans to construct a Western Europe-Western China highway, passing through Almaty. A new airport in Almaty expects to handle about 45 million tonnes of cargo each year. Air Astana is headquartered in the Air Astana Centre 1 in Almaty. Prior to their dissolution, Air Kazakhstan and Kazakhstan Airlines were also headquartered in Almaty.

The economy of Almaty and Almaty Region continues to grow, and is expected to increase by nearly 6.5 percent per year until 2020. To mitigate the rapidly increasing electricity demand caused by this growth, the Kazakh authorities decided to upgrade the power system by building the new transmission line and modernizing the substations. The Alma Transmission Project, supported by the World Bank, has helped achieve this goal.

Cityscape
In 1854, the Tsarist government built a military fortification on the left bank of the Almaty River. The construction was supervised by Major Peremyshelsky and engineer-lieutenant Aleksandrovsky. By the autumn of the same year, construction work was completed. With their arrival, the area of Almaty began to develop rapidly, and a few prominent buildings were constructed during this time including the Little Stanitsa and the Tatar Slobodka. A major earthquake in 1887 destroyed 1798 brick houses and killed 322 people. After the earthquake, numerous notable buildings were constructed including the House of the Regiment of Military Assembly (1908), Ascension Cathedral, the House of Public Assembly, and others. Paul Gourdet, who is credited for most of Almaty's urban architecture of the time, used an approach to design Russian Revival architecture, which is evident in some of his designs including the Medical College, the Voznesensky Cathedral, the merchant Shakhvorostov's house, the former Women's College, the former City Orphanage, and numerous other buildings. Andrei Zenkov is another prominent architect and major contributor to some of Almaty's most notable buildings. At the time, Zenkov was in charge of the construction projects of the Semirechye regional government.

From 1966 to 1972, most of the buildings constructed during the era were earthquake-proof multi-story housing blocks. During this period, many schools, hospitals, cultural, and entertainment facilities were constructed in post-modernist style, including Lenin's Palace (now Palace of the Republic, 1970), Hotel Kazakhstan (1977) and the Medeu (1971).

Attractions

Churches

St. Sophia Cathedral (Almaty)
The Ascension Cathedral is a 56 m high earthquake-resistant structure, built by the architect K. A. Borisoglebsky and engineer A. P. Zenkov in 1907 from blue Tien Shan spruce. It withstood an earthquake with a force of 10 points in 1911. The walls of the cathedral were painted by the local artist N. Khludov. During the Soviet period, the building housed a local history museum. In May 1995, the building was transferred to the Almaty and Semipalatinsk Diocese of the Russian Orthodox Church. After two years of restoration work, services were resumed in the church in 1997.

Fountains
According to the city's Department of Natural Resources and Resource Use Management,  the city had 125 fountains. Among them is the "Oriental Calendar" Fountain, whose 12 sculptural figures represent the 12 animals of the Kazakh 12-year animal cycle (similar to its Chinese counterpart).

There are now more than 120 fountains in Almaty, 61 of which are communally owned. Fountains, together with an extensive irrigation ditch network, play a big role in Alma-Ata – together they create a single complex of reservoirs and watercourses of the city. Every year at the end of spring, the city celebrates the "Day of Fountains" holiday where for the first time after winter, all the city's fountains are turned on. In 2006, a new fountain was opened on Lake Sayran. Previously, the highest fountain in the Commonwealth of Independent States (CIS) gushed from this lake– a stream of water 10 cm in diameter reached a height of 50 meters. The fountain has been closed since 2008.

Recreation

Medeu 

The Medeu is an outdoor speed skating and bandy rink. It is located in a mountain valley (Medeu Valley, or the valley of Malaya Alma-Atinka River) on the south-eastern outskirts of Almaty, Kazakhstan. Medeu sits 1,691 metres above sea level, making it one of the highest skating rinks in the world. It has 10,500 square meters of ice and utilizes a sophisticated freezing and watering system to ensure the quality of the ice.

Medeu was built in 1972 in the gorge of the same name, 15 km from the city. "Medeo" was called "the factory of records", since 126 world records were set on the ice of a high-mountain skating rink in 33 years. A unique feature of the ice rink, located at an altitude of 1700 m, in thin air and high quality ice, provided by pure mountain water without admixture of salts. In addition, Above the sports complex there is a mudflow protection dam and the Shymbulak. In the 1990s, the Medeu was the venue for the Voice of Asia international music festival (Asia Dauysy).

Şymbūlaq 
Şymbūlaq is a ski resort near Almaty, located in the upper part of the Medeu Valley in the Zailiisky Alatau mountain range, at the elevation of 2,200 metres (7,200 ft) above sea level. The resort area is about 25 kilometres (16 mi) south of Almaty city by the Medeu road. It is popular for its mild climate, a large quantity of sunny days and a great amount of snow through the winter (from November until May). The resort offers both day and night skiing.

Big Almaty Lake 
Big Almaty Lake is a natural lake located in Trans-Ili Alatau mountains on 2511 above the sea level near Almaty (15 km South from Almaty).
Like a majority of lakes in Trans-Ili Alatau, this lake formed as the result of an earthquake. The lake is a major source of drinking water for the region. People can access the lake by car (approximately 1 hour drive from the city center), bike, or hiking (approximately a half-day trip).

First President's Park 

The First President's Park is an urban park located in Almaty at the intersection of Navoi Street and Al-Farabi Avenue in the Bostandyq District. The park was opened in July 2010.

Creation of the park began in 2001. The park is broken into three main areas–the avenue, boulevard, and dendrological areas. Greenery was planted according to dendrological plan. In honor of the participation of the city of Almaty in the Olympic torch relay of the Beijing Olympic Games, approximately one hundred spruces and birches were planted. In 2011, a hundred Tien-Shan spruces were also planted. Plans include a set of water projects over an area of 9.5 hectares.

Kök Töbe

An aerial tramway line connects Almaty with a popular recreation area at the top of Kök Töbe (which means 'Blue Hill'), a mountain just to the southeast. It has a variety of tourist attractions, such as a zoo, amusement-park-style rides and restaurants.

The city television tower, Almaty Tower, is located on the hill. It was built in between 1978 and 1983, and is 371.5 m tall. The TV tower, located at an altitude of 1000 m above sea level, is the tallest structure in Almaty. Its height is almost 372 m, and it sits at an elevation of 1130 m. The base of the tower is a reinforced concrete foundation in the form of a three-storey sectional basement. The barrel of the tower is a metal stepped hexahedron with a diameter of 18 m at the base, 13 and 9 m at the locations of maintenance services at heights of 146 and 252 m. The structure was built taking into account the seismic mountainous terrain and can withstand an earthquake of up to 10 points. The television tower is a complex of an operating radio and television transmitting station with a special mode of operation, therefore it is inaccessible for sightseeing tours of the city from a height. The tower, illuminated at night by powerful searchlights, is visible from almost anywhere in the city.

Park of 28 Panfilov Guardsmen 
The Park of 28 Panfilov Guardsmen is a major park in Almaty, Kazakhstan. The park is located in east-central Almaty in the area surrounding Zenkov Cathedral. It is dedicated to and named after the Panfilov Heroes, 28 soldiers of an Almaty infantry unit who died fighting Nazi German invaders outside of Moscow in World War II. The group takes its name from Ivan Panfilov, the General commanding the 316th division which, in spite of heavy casualties, believed at that time managed to significantly delay the Germans' advance on the capital, buying time for the defenders of the city. An eternal flame commemorating the fallen of the Russian Civil War and the Great Patriotic War burns in front of the giant black monument of soldiers from all 15 Soviet republics.

Transportation

Air 

Urban transport 
Sayran Bus Terminal provides intercity bus connections within Kazakhstan, as well as international connections to Kyrgyzstan and China and regional bus connections west of the city. Sayakhat bus terminal provides regional bus connections to places north and east of the city.

Kazakhstan Temir Joly's has two stations Almaty-1 (located 20 minutes drive from Almaty, and reserved mostly for cargo) and Almaty-2 located within the city and reserved mostly for passengers. In 2011 the Almaty Metro opened, and a light rail line is planned.

A bicycle-sharing system, Almaty-bike, has been in operation since September 2016. People can buy a monthly card and ride freely.

Education

Universities

 Kazakh National Medical University, named after Asfendiyarov (former: Almaty Governmental Medical Institute (AGMI))
 Almaty Management University (ALMU)
 International Information Technology University (IITU)
 Kazakh-British Technical University (KBTU)
 University of International Business
 Kazakh National Medical University
 Almaty Institute of Power Engineering and Telecommunications
 Kazakh National Technical University (KazNTU)
 Al-Farabi Kazakh National University (KazNU)
 Suleyman Demirel University (SDU)
 KIMEP University (KIMEP)
 Kazakh-American University (KAU)
 Kazakh National Academy of Arts named by T.Zhurgenov
 Kazakh Academy of Sciences
 Kazakh Academy of Labour and Social Relations
 Kazakh National Pedagogic University (named after Abay)
 Turan University
 Kazakh Ablai Khan University of International Relations and World Languages
 Central Asian University (ЦАУ)
 Kazakh-German University (КНУ)
 Kazakh Leading Academy of Architecture and Civil Engineering
 Kazakh National Agrarian University (SHI, AEZVI)
Narxoz University 
 International Business Academy

Sport

The historic bandy team Dinamo won the Soviet Championships in 1977 and 1990 and the European Cup in 1978. Their home ground was Medeu. Bandy was introduced for the first time at the 2011 Winter Asian Games. Medeu was the main arena at the 2012 Bandy World Championship. The second arena built for the championships is an alternative field at Almaty Central Stadium. The city is now a candidate to host also the 2020 Bandy World Championship. The Federation of International Bandy has opened an office for Asia, which is located in Almaty.

Almaty was the host of the 2017 Winter Universiade with bandy on the programme.

The 2011 Asian Winter Games were held jointly in Almaty and Astana. The ice hockey and ski jumping competitions were held in the city at the Baluan Sholak Sports Palace and Sunkar International Ski Jumping Complex respectively. The biathlon, cross-country skiing, and ski orienteering competitions were held at the nearby Soldatskoe Valley Cross Country Skiing and Biathlon Stadium; the Alpine skiing and bandy competitions were held in nearby Shymbulak and Medeo respectively.

The Yenbek Almaty ice hockey team played from 1965 to 1985 and from 1999 to 2009. HC Almaty currently plays in the Kazakhstan Hockey Championship.

The city's primary football team is FC Kairat founded in 1954 and one of the most successful Kazakh clubs. Futsal club AFC Kairat hs won the UEFA Futsal Cup in 2012–13 and 2014–15. Basketball team BC Almaty won the 2015 and 2016 editions of the Kazakhstan Basketball Cup.

Olympic aspirations

Following the successful hosting of the 2011 Winter Asian Games, Almaty made a bid to host the XXII Olympic Winter Games in 2014, but was eliminated from consideration, not making the "short list" of candidate cities. Almaty was the 2017 Winter Universiade host. The city was exploring possible bids, such as the 2018 Winter Olympics, but did not submit one. Almaty submitted a bid to host the 2022 Winter Olympics in August 2013, but lost to Beijing. Despite these failures, Almaty may still consider to submit a bid to host the 2030 Winter Olympics.

In popular culture 
The fictional espionage novel Performance Anomalies takes place in Almaty, Kazakhstan and many of the city's landmarks make an appearance, including Panfilov Park, Zenkov Cathedral, The Kazakh Museum of Folk Musical Instruments, Kok-Tob (Kök Töbe), Shymbulak, Zelyony Bazaar, and several well-known avenues.

Notable people
 
 

 Zhansaya Abdumalik (born 2000), chess Grandmaster and prodigy
 Altynai Asylmuratova (born 1961), prima ballerina with the Kirov ballet
 Eugen Bauder (born 1986), model in Germany
 Anatoly Bose (born 1988), Australian basketball player
 Alexander Brener (born 1957), film star in Russia
 Sergei Chekmezov (born 1964), professional football coach and former player
 Zarina Diyas (born 1993), tennis player
 Alexandra Elbakyan (born 1988), intellectual property activist, creator of Sci-Hub
 Nagima Eskalieva (born 1954), singer and entertainer
 Dmitri Fofonov (born 1976), Racing cyclist
 Alexey Korolev (born 1987), ski jumper
 Nikolay Karpenko (born 1981), ski jumper
 Ruslana Korshunova (1987–2008), model in Russia
 Olessya Kulakova (born 1977), volleyball representative for Germany
 Regina Kulikova (born 1989), tennis player
 Dinmukhamed Konayev (1912–1993), politician
 Fuat Mansurov (1928–2008), Soviet and Russian conductor
 Dmitriy Ogai (born 1960), soccer trainer and Soviet soccer player
 Sergei Ostapenko (born 1986), soccer player
 Alexander Parygin (born 1973), olympic athlete
 Alexander Petrenko (1976–2006), basketball representative for Russia
 Boris Polak (born 1954), Israeli world champion and Olympic sport shooter
 Vadim Sayutin (born 1970), ice speed skater in Russia
 Thomas Schertwitis (born 1972), water polo
 Olga Shishigina (born 1968), Olympic Champion in hurdling
 Konstantin Sokolenko (born 1987), Nordic combined skier/ski jumper
 Igor Sysoev (born 1970) open-source software engineer, founder of nginx, Inc.
 Elena Likhovtseva (born 1975), tennis player
 Denis Ten (1993-2018), figure skater
 Yernar Yerimbetov (1980), gymnast
 Anatoly Vaisser (born 1949), French chess grandmaster
 Radik Zhaparov (born 1984), ski jumper
 Vladimir Zhirinovsky (1946–2022), politician
 Elena Zoubareva (born 1972), opera singer
 Kinbōzan Haruki (born 1997), sumo wrestler and first Kazakhstani to reach the makuuchi division

Twin towns – sister cities

Almaty is twinned with:

 Alexandria, Egypt
 Bishkek, Kyrgyzstan
 Daegu, South Korea
 Istanbul, Turkey
 Jeddah, Saudi Arabia
 Malatya, Turkey
 Modena, Italy
 Mogadishu, Somalia
 Moscow, Russia
 Rennes, France
 Riga, Latvia
 Rosario, Argentina
 Saint Petersburg, Russia
 Tashkent, Uzbekistan
 Tel Aviv, Israel
 Tucson, Arizona, United States
 Ürümqi, China
 Vilnius, Lithuania

Gallery

International organizations
The International Monetary Fund announced in October 2019 that it would launch a new regional technical assistance centre (RTAC) in Almaty. The centre will provide capacity development services to nine IMF member countries in the CCAM region. The centre is expected to cover the fiscal policy, central bank operations, financial sector supervision, and macroeconomic statistics.

See also

 Almaty International School
 A. Kasteyev State Museum of Arts
 Alma Ata Declaration
 Almaty International Airport
 Architecture of Almaty
 Central State Museum of Kazakhstan
 FC Kairat
 Kazakhstan International School
 Kazakhstan National Museum of Instruments
 Monuments of Almaty
 Malus sieversii
 Shymbulak – ski resort
 WikiBilim Public Foundation
 The Golden Square (Almaty)

References

Further reading

External links 

 City of Almaty  Official website
 Almaty Tourism Website
 
 Link to Almaty airport
 New buildings and developers of Almaty

 
Cities in Central Asia
Former national capitals
Populated places along the Silk Road
Populated places established in 1854
Cities and towns in Kazakhstan
Regions of Kazakhstan
Semirechye Oblast
1854 establishments in the Russian Empire